The Independence Park Botanic Gardens are botanical gardens located in Independence Park at 7950 Independence Boulevard, Baton Rouge, Louisiana. They are open during daylight hours without admission fee.

The Gardens contain displays of blooming woody plants, ground covers, and wetland plants. They include a rose garden, crape myrtle garden, sensory garden, and children's forest.

See also
List of botanical gardens in the United States

Botanical gardens in Louisiana
Buildings and structures in Baton Rouge, Louisiana
Tourist attractions in Baton Rouge, Louisiana
Protected areas of East Baton Rouge Parish, Louisiana